Sir George Skene of Fintray (1619–1708) was a Scottish merchant in the Baltic trade who served as Provost of the city of Aberdeen from 1676 to 1685.  He was knighted in 1681.

He was a burgh commissioner for Aberdeen in the Parliament of Scotland from 1681 to 1682 and 1685 to 1686. 

On his death in December 1708 he was buried in the family plot at the Kirk of St Nicholas. The flat stone lies close to the west boundary wall around midway on its length.

Today he is most famous and widely known, not for his time as Provost, but for the house he bought in Aberdeen in 1669, now home to a biographical museum.

References

External links
 Portrait of Sir George Skene

Skene
Skene
Burgh Commissioners to the Parliament of Scotland
Members of the Parliament of Scotland 1681–1682
Members of the Parliament of Scotland 1685–1686